USS Merrimack, was a ship launched by an Association of Newburyport Shipwrights and presented to the Navy in 1798. She was the first ship of the Navy to be named for the Merrimack River. She saw action in the Quasi-War.

Service history
Captain Moses Brown commanded Merrimack when she was placed in service in December 1798. She departed Boston on 3 January 1799 for the Windward Islands to protect American merchantmen in the Caribbean during the naval war with France. She arrived Prince Rupert Bay on the 20th, and, for the next two years, cruised in the West Indies and escorted convoys to the United States. 

On 28 June 1799, she took her first prize L'Magicienne, the former American naval schooner , captured on 20 November 1798 and taken into the French Navy.

Merrimack freed American brig Ceres, 6 June 1800, after it had been taken by L'Hazard on 18 May 1800. On arriving off Curaçao, 22 September, she found that a French force of 16 ships from Guadeloupe was besieging the city with 1,400 men. The American gunners replied with great spirit driving the enemy troops from their guns, but from time to time, during the night, the French soldiers renewed the cannonade. The next morning, the French troops reembarked in confusion and fled.

Merrimack captured French privateer sloop Phoenix on 20 October 1800, and later in the year took French brig Brilliant. A list of American prizes credits Merrimack with recapturing British schooner Godfrey, but gives no details about the action.

She was stripped of naval equipment and sold in 1801. Subsequently, while operating in merchant service under the name Monticello, the ship was lost off Cape Cod, Massachusetts.

References

External links
 USC Merrimack (1799) 3decks 

 

1798 ships
19th-century maritime incidents
Quasi-War ships of the United States
Ships built in Newburyport, Massachusetts
Ships lost with all hands
Shipwrecks of the Massachusetts coast